is a Japanese mystery/crime writer. He is the President of Honkaku Mystery Writers Club of Japan and one of the representative writers of the new traditionalist movement in Japanese mystery writing. His works are deeply influenced by Ellery Queen and Ross Macdonald.

Works in English translation
Short story
 An Urban Legend Puzzle (original title: Toshi Densetsu Pazuru), trans. Beth Cary
Ellery Queen's Mystery Magazine, January 2004
Passport to Crime: Finest Mystery Stories from International Crime Writers, Running Press, 2007 
The Mammoth Book of Best International Crime, Robinson Publishing, 2009 
 The Lure of the Green Door (original title: Midori no Tobira wa Kiken), trans. Ho-Ling Wong
Ellery Queen's Mystery Magazine, November 2014

Awards
 2000 – The Best Japanese Crime Fiction of the Year (2000 Honkaku Mystery Best 10): Norizuki Rintarō no Shin Bōken (The New Adventures of Rintaro Norizuki)
 2002 – Mystery Writers of Japan Award for Best Short Story: An Urban Legend Puzzle
 2005 – Honkaku Mystery Award for Best Fiction: Namakubi ni Kiite miro (The Gorgon's Look )
 2005 – The Best Japanese Crime Fiction of the Year (2005 Kono Mystery ga Sugoi!): Namakubi ni Kiite miro (The Gorgon's Look)
 2005 – The Best Japanese Crime Fiction of the Year (2005 Honkaku Mystery Best 10): Namakubi ni Kiite miro (The Gorgon's Look)
 2013 – The Best Japanese Crime Fiction of the Year (2013 Honkaku Mystery Best 10): Kingu o Sagase (Find the King)

Bibliography

Detective Rintaro Norizuki series
 Novels
 , 1989
 , 1989
 , 1990
 , 1991
 , 1992
 , 1994
 , 2004
 , 2011
 Short story collections
 , 1992
 , 1999
 , 2002
  (The Tragedy of Equal Y)
  (The Chinese Snail Mystery)
  (An Urban Legend Puzzle, Ellery Queen's Mystery Magazine, January 2004)
  (ABCD encirclement)
 
 , 2008
 , 2012

Standalone novels
 , 1988
 , 2006 – Juvenile mystery novel

Short story collections
 , 1996
 , 2008
 , 2013

See also
Golden Age of Detective Fiction#The "new traditionalist" movement in Japanese mystery writing
Honkaku Mystery Writers Club of Japan

References

External links
 Profile at J'Lit Books from Japan 
 Reviews of Norizuki's works by Ho-Ling Wong 
 Ellery Queen is Alive and Well and Living in Japan | CriminalElement.com 

1964 births
20th-century Japanese novelists
21st-century Japanese novelists
Japanese male short story writers
Japanese mystery writers
Japanese crime fiction writers
Mystery Writers of Japan Award winners
Honkaku Mystery Award winners
Living people
People from Shimane Prefecture
20th-century Japanese short story writers
21st-century Japanese short story writers
Male novelists
20th-century Japanese male writers
21st-century male writers
Writers from Shimane Prefecture